Kodiyalam is a village in the Orathanadu taluk of Thanjavur district, Tamil Nadu, India.

References 
 

Villages in Thanjavur district